Leopoldo Ruiz (7 August 1926 – 10 May 1986) is an Argentine professional golfer. He tied for fifth place in the 1958 Open Championship and tied for ninth the following year. He represented Argentina eight times in the World Cup.

Golf career
Born in Buenos Aires, Ruiz worked as a caddie in Buenos Aires, before turning professional in 1951.

During his career, Ruiz won the Argentine Professional Ranking four times, and competed in seven major championships, appearing five times in The Open Championship, from 1958 to 1961 and 1968, and twice in the Masters Tournament in 1962 and 1965. In 1958, he missed out on being in a playoff for the Open title, when he had a triple bogey at the last hole at Royal Lytham & St Annes to finish tied for 5th place, three strokes off the leaders. A year later, at Muirfield, he finished in a tie for 9th.

In 1960, on the European circuit, Ruiz was second in the French Open, and a year later finished fourth in the German Open. He had most success in South America, where he won the Argentine Open in 1957 and 1959, the Colombian Open and the Uruguay Open in 1958, and the Argentine PGA Championship on six occasions, in addition to many other regional opens. He was also second in the Brazil Open in 1957 and 1958, the Argentine Open in 1960 and 1973, and the Colombian Open in 1972.

Ruiz represented Argentina in the World Cup on eight occasions between 1957 and 1969, and was runner up in the team competition alongside Roberto De Vicenzo in 1964.

Professional wins

Argentine wins (27)
1953 Argentine PGA Championship
1956 Argentine PGA Championship
1957 Argentine Open, Abierto del Litoral, South Open
1958 Argentine PGA Championship, Abierto del Litoral
1959 Argentine Open, Metropolitan Championship
1960 Center Open
1961 Argentine PGA Championship, Center Open
1963 Argentine Masters, North Open
1964 Center Open, Rio Cuarto Open
1965 Argentine Masters, Metropolitan Championship
1966 South Open, Center Open, Rio Cuarto Open
1967 Argentine PGA Championship, Abierto del Litoral
1968 Jockey Club Rosario Open
1970 South Open
1972 Jujuy Open
1975 Argentine PGA Championship

Other wins (3)
1958 Colombian Open, Uruguay Open
1968 Los Leones Open (Chile)

Results in major championships

Note: Ruiz never played in the U.S. Open nor the PGA Championship.

CUT = missed the halfway cut (3rd round cut in 1968 Open Championship)
"T" = tied

Team appearances
World Cup (representing Argentina): 1957, 1958, 1959, 1960, 1961, 1964, 1966, 1969

References

Argentine male golfers
Sportspeople from Buenos Aires
1926 births
1986 deaths